Tenkodogo is the capital city of Boulgou Province and the Centre-Est Region of Burkina Faso with a population of 61,936 (2019).

Economy
The villages surrounding Tenkodogo are primarily based around animal husbandry.

The main market takes place every 3 days.

The Restaurant Patisserie Salon du Thé is known for its tea, yoghurt and pastries.

The Le Rotisseur restaurant is known for its grilled chicken.

Notable hotels include Hotel Djamou, Hotel Djamou Annexe, Hotel Laafi, and Auberge Riale.

Politics
On 29 January 2016, the king of Tenkodogo, Naba Saga, died while in Thailand for hospital care. He was the 28th king of Tenkodogo according to tradition and was inducted on 5 October 2001. He had taken the position after the death of his father, Naba Tigre, in September 2001. He was succeeded by Naba Guiguem-Pollé as king.

Transport
The town is connected to Koupéla and Bittou, along the N15 highway.

Climate 
Köppen-Geiger climate classification system classifies its climate as hot semi-arid (BSh) that closely borders with tropical wet and dry (Aw).

Demographics

See also
List of cities in Burkina Faso

References

External links

Populated places in the Centre-Est Region